Tyra Vaughn (March 13, 1923 – August 9, 2015) was an American actress, model, and showgirl, who appeared in motion pictures and television throughout the 1940s and late 1950s, and who later found a second career as a professional dance instructor.

Early life
She was born on March 13, 1923, in Scranton, Pennsylvania. Her father was a well-respected police sergeant and she was the firstborn within a household that produced four children. She attended West Scranton High School from which was she was active in the drama club and graduated in June 1941. With the outbreak of World War II, she moved to Los Angeles and joined the USO as a professional dancer.

In 1943, she joined other variety showgirls in protesting a waiters' strike at Earl Carroll's Theater-Restaurant in Hollywood. She was a swimsuit model, named "Miss Springtime of 1944" by the Blue Book modeling agency, run by Emmeline Snively. Later in 1944 she appeared as an artist's model in a segment for NBC's People are Funny program.

Career after World War II
After the war, Vaughn was a dance instructor for the Hollywood Athletic Club, before producer Samuel Goldwyn selected her for his 1940s Goldwyn Girls ensemble. She later appeared (without credits) in such movies as The Harvey Girls (1946), The Kid from Brooklyn (1946), Down to Earth (1947), Letter from an Unknown Woman (1948), Duchess of Idaho (1950), and Gentlemen Prefer Blondes (1953). As a friend of actress and swimmer Esther Williams, she landed a recurring role on the Lux Video Theatre with Williams' help, appearing in several episodes between 1950 and 1957. When the series ended, Vaughn left acting and lived in Southern California, teaching dance until her 1988 retirement.

Personal life
Vaughn died aged 92 on August 9, 2015, in Northridge, California, from natural causes. Her remains were donated to medical science at the UCLA Medical Center. Vaughn never married. In 1947, she adopted and raised a son all on her own. She was survived by her son, a daughter-in-law, one younger sister, and several nieces, nephews, grandchildren, and great-grandchildren.

Vaughn, who was of Irish descent, was a self-described lifelong Roman Catholic and a conservative minded Republican.

Filmography

References

External links
 

1923 births
2015 deaths
20th-century American actresses
Actors from Scranton, Pennsylvania
Actresses from Pennsylvania
American ballroom dancers
American female dancers
American film actresses
American memoirists
American tap dancers
American television actresses
American women memoirists
Dance teachers
Dancers from Pennsylvania
People from Greater Los Angeles
Western (genre) film actresses
American Roman Catholics
California Republicans
Pennsylvania Republicans
American people of Irish descent